Lucifuga teresinarum is a species of cavefish in the family Bythitidae. It is endemic to Cuba.

References

Bythitidae
Endemic fauna of Cuba
Freshwater fish of Cuba
Cave fish
Taxonomy articles created by Polbot
Fish described in 1988